The 1974 County Championship was the 75th officially organised running of the County Championship. Worcestershire won the Championship title.

Points system

10 points for a win
5 points to each side for a tie
5 points to side still batting in a match in which scores finish level
Bonus points awarded in the first 100 overs of the first innings
Batting: 150 runs - 1 point, 200 runs - 2 points 250 runs - 3 points, 300 runs - 4 points
 Bowling: 3 wickets - 1 point, 5 wickets - 2 points 7 wickets - 3 points, 9 wickets - 4 points
No bonus points awarded in a match starting with less than 8 hours' play remaining.
The two first innings limited to a total of 200 overs. The side batting first limited to 100 overs. Any overs up to 100 not used by the side batting first could be added to the overs of the side batting second.
Position determined by points gained. If equal, then decided on most wins.
Each team plays 20 matches.
All counties are required to achieve an overall average of at least 18.5 overs per hour. Counties failing to achieve this will be fined £1000, of which the club will pay half and the players half.

Table

References

1974 in English cricket
County Championship seasons